Paradise Cracked is a cyberpunk single-player turn-based tactics video game. It was created by MiST Land South (renamed as GFI Russia in 2006) for Microsoft Windows and released in 2002. It has several translation problems that make the game difficult to understand in English.

The player starts as a character named "Hacker" who is just as the name implies. The player starts with a pistol and the ability to hack certain objects (ATM's, Trade Robots, etc.) as well as a journal which gives maps of the area and tells them missions both current and completed. As certain missions are completed, the character's level will increase and skills can have points added to them increasing areas like strength, aim, hacking skill, health points and so forth.

The game offers the option to play solo or to join with other characters or groups (such as the mob). Hacker is constantly hunted by the law making teaming up with someone in the best interest of the player's survival. Teaming up will also add new missions to Hacker's journal.

Additional weapons, items, and body armor can be acquired by purchase or by killing another player. The character's strength determines what weight of weapons, items etc. he can carry while certain clothing will increase or decrease the number of items they can carry. The heavier the weight, the less distance the character can move in a given turn. As strength and level increase, so will a character's distance he can travel.

The game never really gained much ground in terms of commercial success.

Further reading
 Review on GameSpot.com
 Review on GameSpy.com
 Review by PC Zone Magazine
 Preview Screens at ComputerAndVideoGames.com
 Another preview from CVG.com
 Review on itc.ua 
 Review on ag.ru 
 Review on IgroMania.ru

External links

2002 video games
Cyberpunk video games
Turn-based tactics video games
Video games developed in Russia
Windows games
Windows-only games
Transhumanism in video games